Jacques Mercier (born 17 October 1943 in Mouscron) is a Belgian writer and television and radio presenter.

The third eldest son of René and Denise Mercier, Jacques Mercier was educated at St. Joseph's College. Mercier joined RTBF in September 1963 and started his career by hosting radio shows such as Dimanche musique (with ) and Musique au petit déjeuner.

In November 2008, Mercier left the RTBF after 45 years of work.

References

External links
  Jacques Mercier official website 

1943 births
Living people
People from Mouscron
Belgian television presenters
Belgian journalists
Male journalists
20th-century Belgian writers
20th-century Belgian male writers